Mister Butler is a 2000 Indian Malayalam-language comedy-drama film scripted and directed by Sasi Shanker. It is a remake of the 1996 Tamil film Gopala Gopala. The film stars Dileep and Ruchita Prasad. The music was composed by Vidyasagar. Though failed to find audience initially later became sleeper hit due to positive word of mouth.

Plot 

Gopalakrishnan (Dileep) a chef by profession arrives at a flat and mesmerises all the housewife's in the building with his amazing skills in cooking. He solves several problems within the houses of several families living in the flat and thus gains the trust of everyone. In a food fest he impresses one of the customers who is the director of a channel and gets an opportunity to perform a food show on the channel. He goes to the channel office where he has to go to perform a cooking show. But the show gets cancelled and he gets trapped in the lift there with Radhika Menon (Ruchita Prasad). Inside the lift, he befriends Radhika with his innovative ideas for light and food and cooks biriyani for her inside the lift. Radhika turns out to be the cinematographer of Gopalakrishnan's food show. Soon they fall in love during the shoot of food show episodes, and they marry with the support of his neighbours and Radhika's rich household. In the middle of their marriage ceremony, Radhika learns that Gopalakrishnan has already married a girl named Mallika and she asked permission from Gopalakrishnan to go with her lover as she was pregnant with her lover's child. Radhika feels upset thinking Gopalakrishnan cheated her without disclosing this information. She refuses to live with Gopalakrishnan. But everyone convinces her to give Gopalakrishnan a chance and she moves in to his house, to a different room, accompanied by her grandmother who fuels her mistrust because she does not like Gopalakrishnan. During that time Gopalakrishnan's friend (Innocent) arrives who is a cook in the army right now and acts as his father. He tries to her Gopalakrishnan win Radhika back, but his plans misfire and lead to problems instead. One day Radhika comes home to see Mallika leaving the house and this leads to Radhika deciding to end all relations with Gopalakrishnan, and she goes to her home asks for a divorce from Gopalakrishnan. Saddened by the events Gopalakrishnan drives car in deep mental agony, and ends up getting hit by a lorry. He is however, taken to the hospital on time and his life is saved. Meanwhile, Radhika's father, upon coming to know that Radhika had initiated divorce proceedings against Gopalakrishnan, tells her that Gopalakrishnan had informed the father of the marriage with Mallika and her eloping, etc. earlier itself, and that the father did not convey it to Radhika because he did not consider it relevant. Apparently, Mallika was Gopalakrishnan's uncle's daughter and because he allowed her to elope with her lover, the uncle and sons attacked Gopalakrishnan and he was forced to flee from his hometown. Radhika on being informed about Gopalakrishnan's past and his talks with her father feels guilty for causing this immense pain for Gopalakrishnan. At the hospital Radhika asks for forgiveness and they reunite there.

Cast 
 Dileep as Gopalakrishnan
 Ruchita Prasad as Radhika Menon
 Innocent as Captain K. G. Nair
 Jagathy Sreekumar as Achayan
 Nedumudi Venu as Radhika's father
 Kuthiravattam Pappu as  Sivaraman
 Zeenath as Sivaraman's wife
 Janardhanan as Ramakrishnan
 Renuka Banu as Manju, Ramakrishnan's wife
 Manju Pillai as Aanandham
 Cochin Haneefa as Thirupathy, Aanandham's husband
 Vijayan as Vijayan
 Chithra as Vijayan's wife
 Lalithasree
 Philomina as Radhika's Grandmother
 Manka Mahesh as Radhika's mother
 Kalabhavan Mani as 'Major' Kuttan
 Sonia as Gopalakrishnan's first wife
 Madhupal as Madhu

Soundtrack 
The film's soundtrack contains six songs composed by Vidyasagar, with lyrics by Gireesh Puthenchery. It was released on 19 July 2003 by Satyam Audios.

References

External links
 

2000 films
2000s Malayalam-language films
Films scored by Vidyasagar
Malayalam remakes of Tamil films
Films directed by Sasi Shanker